Konya Tajae Plummer (born 2 August 1997) is a Jamaican professional footballer who plays as a centre back for the Jamaica national team.

Early life
Plummer's interest in football started while she was attending kindergarten, where she was exposed to the game by a relative who took her to the park in Annotto Bay to watch the sport. Plummer started playing for Rangers FC at age 11 with a boys' team in St Mary and two years later was captaining that team. Plummer then transferred to Titchfield High School in Portland with the help of vice-president of the Portland Football Association (PFA), Garfield Fuller, where she was able to participate in the Daryl Vaz-sponsored female football league. She represented the school for two years, winning the competition in both seasons. Based on her performance, she was recommended by the PFA to the national program. Plummer emigrated to the United States aged 16.

College
Plummer played four seasons of college soccer as a student athlete. Between 2016 and 2017, she played as a forward at Southeastern University where she scored 19 goals and made 16 assists in her 38 appearances for the team. As a freshman she led the team in assists with 10. On 7 October 2017, Plummer scored a career-high four goals in a match against Florida Memorial. Ahead of the 2018 season, Plummer transferred to UCF Knights, making the switch to defender in the process. In the 2019 season, Plummer was named AAC Defensive Player of the Year, having started 16 of 17 matches and only allowing seven goals, and was selected to the AAC First Team.

Club career
On 16 January 2020, Plummer was selected by Orlando Pride in the second round (10th overall) of the 2020 NWSL College Draft. She became the first Jamaica-born player drafted in NWSL history. Plummer signed a two-year contract with the team on 3 March. Plummer made her professional debut on 11 October versus Houston Dash. She appeared in two Fall Series matches in total for a combined 70 minutes.

On 17 August 2021, Plummer was loaned to Swedish Damallsvenskan club AIK for the remainder of 2021 Damallsvenskan season. She made six appearances, all as a starter, helping keep three shutouts as AIK finished 10th.

On 8 December 2021, Plummer had her Orlando Pride contract option declined and was released to the waiver wire.

International career
In 2018, Plummer competed in 2018 CONCACAF Women's Championship with Jamaica women's national team.

Plummer captained the Reggae Girlz at the 2019 FIFA Women's World Cup in France. It was the first time a Caribbean nation had qualified for the women's tournament. She played every minute for Jamaica as the team was eliminated at the Group Stage after losing all three games against Brazil, Italy and Australia.

Personal life
In July 2022, Plummer took to social media to announce she was pregnant.

Career statistics

College

Club 
.

International goals
Scores and results list Jamaica's goal tally first

References

External links 
 UCF Knights player profile
 

1997 births
Living people
Jamaican women's footballers
People from Saint Mary Parish, Jamaica
Women's association football central defenders
Jamaica women's international footballers
2019 FIFA Women's World Cup players
Southeastern University (Florida) alumni
UCF Knights women's soccer players
Orlando Pride draft picks
Orlando Pride players
Jamaican expatriate women's footballers
Jamaican expatriate sportspeople in the United States
Expatriate women's soccer players in the United States
Jamaican expatriate sportspeople in Sweden
Expatriate women's footballers in Sweden
National Women's Soccer League players